Trichodectidae is a family of louse in the suborder Ischnocera. Its species are parasites of mammals. The following 19 genera are recognized:

 Bovicola 
 Cebidicola 
 Damalinia 
 Dasyonyx 
 Eurytrichodectes 
 Eutrichophilus 
 Felicola 
 Geomydoecus 
 Lutridia 
 Neotrichodectes 
 Paratrichodectes 
 Procavicola 
 Procaviphilus 
 Protelicola 
 Stachiella 
 Thomomydoecus 
 Trichodectes 
 Tricholipeurus 
 Werneckodectes

References

Lice
Insect families